Rocket Science is a studio album by Béla Fleck and the Flecktones, released in 2011. It reached number 1 on the Billboard Jazz chart and number 36 on the Top Independent  Albums chart.
The song "Life in Eleven" won Best Instrumental Composition at the 54th Annual Grammy Awards.

The album is the first since 1992's UFO Tofu to feature founding member Howard Levy in the regular band lineup.

Reception 

In his AllMusic review, music critic Thom Jurek praised the album, calling the Flecktones re-energized. He wrote "With Levy on harmonica and piano, it's as if he never left. Rather than try to re-create the band's old sound, the Flecktones push ever further into their own seamless, unclassifiable meld of jazz, progressive bluegrass, rock, classical, funk, and world music traditions on this delightful—and at times mind-blowing—record."

Track listing
All songs by Béla Fleck unless otherwise noted.
 "Gravity Lane" – 5:58
 "Prickly Pear" – 3:49
 "Joyful Spring" (Howard Levy) – 2:39
 "Life In Eleven" (H. Levy/B. Fleck) – 5:25
 "Falling Forward" – 5:08
 "Storm Warning" – 7:57
 "Like Water" (Victor Wooten/B. Fleck) – 4:42
 "Earthling Parade" – 7:58
 "The Secret Drawer" (Future Man) – 2:12
 "Sweet Pomegranates" (H. Levy) – 5:55
 "Falani" – 6:50
 "Bottle Rocket" – 5:53
Deluxe Edition
 "Wolf Laurel" – 6:05

Personnel
Béla Fleck – 5-string banjo (tracks 1, 3-8, 10-12), Goldtone 10-string Prototype (track 8), Deering Crossfire electric banjo (tracks 2, 6)
Future Man – drumitar, acoustic drums, percussion
Howard Levy – diatonic harmonica (tracks 1, 2, 4-8, 11, 12), bass harmonica (track 8), synth (track 2), piano (tracks 1-7, 10, 12)
Victor Wooten – Fodera 4-string bass, Fodera 5-string NYC bass, Compito 5-string fretless bass (track 5, 8, 11)

Production notes:
Béla Fleck – producer
Kevin Dailey – engineer
Richard Battaglia – engineer
Richard Dodd – mastering
Jeremy Cowart – photography
Sean Marlowe – art direction, design
Paul Grosso – cover art, creative director

References

2011 albums
Béla Fleck and the Flecktones albums
MNRK Music Group albums